Rhene timidus is a species of jumping spider in the genus Rhene that lives in South Africa. Only the female has been described, in 2013. It has a distinctive epigyne featuring spiralling ridges.

Taxonomy
Rhene timidus was first identified by Wanda Wesołowska and Charles Haddad in 2013. It was allocated to the genus Rhene, which is named after the Greek female name, shared by mythological figures. The genus is part of the subtribe Dendryphantina in the tribe Dendryphantini, and is related to the genera Dendryphantes and Macaroeris. The species name means cautious and is in reference to the very delicate sclerotization of the epigyne.

Description
Only the female of Rhene timidus has been described. It is a small spider, typical for the genus, but larger than the similar Rhene facilis. The carapace is brown, broadened and covered with small white hairs. The clypeus is very low and dark. The epigyne is distinctive, with spiralling sclerotized ridges around the copulatory openings. It is similar to the related Rhene ferkensis found in Ivory Coast but differs by having longer seminal ducts and the ridges surround the copulatory openings.

Distribution
The spider has been only identified at one location, in the Amathole Mountains, East Cape, South Africa.

References

Citations

Bibliography

Endemic fauna of South Africa
Salticidae
Spiders of South Africa
Spiders described in 2013
Taxa named by Wanda Wesołowska